Garas is a surname. Notable people with the surname include:

Dániel Garas (born 1973), Hungarian cinematographer and photographer
Dezső Garas (1934–2011), Hungarian actor
Kaz Garas (born 1940), Lithuanian-American actor
Sven Garas (born 1978), Norwegian pop musician, songwriter and producer

See also
Gara